Stéphane Noro (born 22 January 1979) is a French former professional footballer who played as a midfielder.

External links

1979 births
Living people
Association football midfielders
French footballers
French expatriate footballers
Lille OSC players
Stade de Reims players
CS Sedan Ardennes players
FC Metz players
ES Troyes AC players
Le Havre AC players
RC Strasbourg Alsace players
Apollon Limassol FC players
Ligue 1 players
Ligue 2 players
Cypriot First Division players
Expatriate footballers in Cyprus